Manzoor Ahmad Pashteen (Pashto: منظور احمد پښتين, Urdu: منظور احمد پشتین) is a Pakistani Pashtun human rights activist from South Waziristan. He is the chairman of Pashtun Tahafuz Movement (PTM).

("Pashtun Protection Movement"), a social movement based in Khyber Pakhtunkhwa and Balochistan. From 11 to 14 March 2022, he was part of the Pashtun National Jirga, which was held in Bannu to discuss the critical issues faced by the Pashtuns in Pakistan and Afghanistan.

Early life and education
Pashteen was born in 1994 in Shahur (or Shaheer), Mawle Khan Sarai, a small village near the town of Sarwakai in South Waziristan, Pakistan. The eldest of eight siblings, Pashteen belongs to the Shamankhel Mahsud tribe of the Pashtuns. His father, Abdul Wadud Mahsud, is a primary school teacher at his village.

Pashteen received his early education at his village's school in South Waziristan. In 2005, because of military operations by the Pakistan Armed Forces against militants, Pashteen and his family were forced to flee Waziristan to settle in IDP refugee camps in Dera Ismail Khan, Khyber Pakhtunkhwa. The family fled from their home in Waziristan for the second time in 2007, and returned in 2008, but fled again in 2008 due to Operation Zalzala. In 2009, because of Operation Rah-e-Nijat, he and his family were forced to flee Waziristan for the fourth time. Pashteen completed his secondary education at Army Public School in Bannu and higher secondary education in Karak. His father was determined to ensure his education. "Only I know", Pashteen said, "my father borrowed money for my schooling and only I know how much we have suffered". Pashteen received his Doctor of Veterinary Medicine degree in 2016 at the Gomal University, Dera Ismail Khan. When he and his family returned to Waziristan in 2016, they found that their books had been looted, their home ruined, and landmines were scattered over their lands.

Pashtun Tahafuz Movement 

In May 2014, during his studies at the Gomal University, Pashteen founded the "Mahsud Tahafuz Movement", a social movement mainly focused on removing landmines from Waziristan (especially Mahsud land).

The Pashtun Tahafuz Movement (Movement for the Protection of Pashtuns, PTM) campaigns against war, blaming both Islamist militants and the Pakistani military for the destruction. The region has been a war zone since the 1980s, since the Cold War between the Soviet Union and United States and the following conflict between western and Islamist forces.

Pashtun Long March
The PTM rose to prominence after Naqeebullah Mehsud, accused of militant connections, was killed by police in Karachi on 20 January 2018. Human rights groups note that the war on terrorism has served as a pretense for authorities to persecute Pashtuns, with thousands of young Pashtuns like Mehsud killed or abducted by authorities on shaky charges. Due to their dominance of the Taliban, Pashtuns overall have been branded as Islamists or militants.

On January 26, 2018, Pashteen and 20 friends started a protest march from Dera Ismail Khan. Many people joined the march along the way, and it reached Peshawar on January 28. Upon reaching Islamabad on February 1, the Pashtun Tahafuz Movement organized a sit-in called "All Pashtun National Jirga". The jirga condemned the fake encounter killing of Naqeebullah Mehsud, a 27-year old Pashtun shopkeeper from Waziristan, perpetrated by the Karachi Police under Rao Anwar Ahmed Khan. Among other demands, the jirga also appealed the government to set up a judicial inquiry for Naqeebullah Mehsud, as well as for all the other Pashtuns murdered extrajudicially in police encounters. On 13 March 2018 Human Rights Watch seconded the call to investigate Mehsud's killers and called on the Pakistani government to drop criminal cases against Manzoor Pashteen and other protest leaders.

There was grand gathering of PTM in the center of Khyber Pakhtunkhwa, Peshawar on 8 April 2018.

Ongoing activism 
The PTM demands an end to the extrajudicial killings and disappearances, and what they allege to be the Pakistani military establishment's policy of labeling Taliban groups as either "good" or "bad" depending on whether they support the state of Pakistan. A PTM official accused both state institutions and the 'good Taliban' of threatening the PTM. They also demand removal of landmines from northwestern tribal areas, and that the army cease demolishing houses of Pashtuns accused of militant ties.

In 2019, following the Kharqamar incident, a clash on 26 May between PTM supporters and Pakistani troops that left at least 13 dead, Pashteen spoke to Deutsche Welle in an interview. He accused authorities of firing on demonstrators and suppressing media reports, as well as attempting to rig elections in tribal areas where PTM candidates were likely to win. He denied anti-state and anti-Pakistan sentiment, saying that the PTM is anti-terrorism, while accusing the army of involvement in such activities.

Detentions
On 5 September 2017, Pashteen and his father, along with two other human rights activists, Jamal Malyar and Shah Faisal Ghazi, were detained by Pakistani security forces at Barwand check post in Tiarza Tehsil, South Waziristan. Pashteen was beaten up under the allegation that his human rights campaign damaged military morale. “I said, you are building your morale by killing innocent children and then calling us terrorists,” Pashteen later told. As a result of the social media campaign for them by their supporters, they were released on 6 September by the military.

On 27 January 2020, Pashteen was arrested by the police in Peshawar on allegations of sedition. The arrest was criticized by then Afghan President Ashraf Ghani. Human Rights Watch (HRW) urged Pakistani authorities to release Pashteen and drop the charges against him, saying "using criminal laws to chill free expression and political opposition has no place in a democracy." In one of the protests against the arrest outside the National Press Club in Islamabad on 28 January, PTM leader and member of the National Assembly Mohsin Dawar, Ismat Shahjahan and Ammar Rashid of the Awami Workers Party (AWP), and 26 other protesters were arrested. Ismat Shahjahan and Mohsin Dawar were released on 29 January but Ammar Rashid and 22 others were sent to jail on sedition charges; all charges were dropped against them on 17 February. On 2 February, at least 43 activists were briefly arrested from other protests held in solidarity with Pashteen in Dera Ismail Khan, Karachi and Faisalabad. After almost a month in jail, Pashteen was released on 25 February and was received by a large number of PTM workers.

On 28 March 2021, the police arrested Pashteen in Kohat and Mohsin Dawar in Karak to prevent both of them from travelling to Bannu to join and lead the Janikhel protest march. The protest was called off on 29 March after an agreement was signed between the protesters and Mahmood Khan, the Chief Minister of Khyber Pakhtunkhwa, following which Pashteen and Dawar were released.

Controversy 
Many Afghan activists support the PTM in solidarity for Pashtuns in both Afghanistan and Pakistan. The Afghan government has praised Pashteen's work, with President Ashraf Ghani supporting the march in February, leading some groups to accuse him and the PTM of "foreign backing". In May 2019 Major General Asif Ghafoor, serving as a spokesman for the Pakistani military, alleged that Indian and Afghan intelligence agencies were funding the PTM.

Pashteen has rejected the allegations of being a foreign agent for Research and Analysis Wing (RAW) of India or the National Directorate of Security of Afghanistan.

Pashteen cap

Pashteen usually wears the Mazari hat at public events and rallies, leading to the hat becoming an iconic symbol of the Pashtun Tahafuz Movement, and being widely renamed after him as the "Pashteen cap" or "Manzoor cap".

See also
Killing of Naqeebullah Mehsud
Federally Administered Tribal Areas (FATA)
 List of peace activists

References

Pashtun nationalists
People from South Waziristan
1994 births
Living people
Pakistani activists
Minority rights activists
Pashtun rights activists
Pashtun Tahafuz Movement politicians
Pakistani human rights activists
Pakistani prisoners and detainees
Gomal University alumni